Egerton Lowndes Wright  (15 November 1885 – 11 May 1918) was an English cricketer and soldier who played first-class cricket for Lancashire and Oxford University from 1905 to 1910.

He was born in Chorley, Lancashire, and educated at Winchester College and New College, Oxford. He appeared in 37 first-class matches as a right-handed batsman and occasional wicketkeeper. He scored 1638 runs with a highest score of 95 and held 26 catches with three stumpings.

He married Violet Shakespear in 1911. They had two children. 

In World War I, Wright was a captain with the Oxfordshire and Buckinghamshire Light Infantry. He went to France in 1915 and served there with distinction, being awarded the Military Cross and twice mentioned in dispatches. He was killed in action near Barly, Somme, on 11 May 1918.

References

External links

1885 births
1918 deaths
Military personnel from Lancashire
People educated at Winchester College
Alumni of New College, Oxford
Oxfordshire and Buckinghamshire Light Infantry officers
British Army personnel of World War I
British military personnel killed in World War I
Recipients of the Military Cross
English cricketers
Lancashire cricketers
Oxford University cricketers
Marylebone Cricket Club cricketers